Chitaavia was an airline based in Chita, Russia. It operated scheduled passenger and cargo services, as well as aerial work, out of its base at Kadala Airport unsing a single aircraft, a Tupolev Tu-154B-2. Founded in 1991, the company was acquired by VIM Airlines in 2004.

History
At the end of 2004, VIM Airlines acquired Chitaavia.

References

Defunct airlines of Russia
Former Aeroflot divisions
Airlines established in 1991
Airlines disestablished in 2004
1991 establishments in Russia
Companies based in Zabaykalsky Krai
2004 disestablishments in Russia